In the 2015–16 season, Partizani Tirana competed in the Kategoria Superiore for the third consecutive season. The club finished second at the end of the season, which was their best result since 2008.

First-team squad
Squad at end of season

Transfers

Summer

In:

Out:

Winter 

In:

Out:

Competitions

Kategoria Superiore

League table

Results summary

Results by round

Matches

Albanian Cup

First round

Second round

Quarter-finals

UEFA Europa League

First qualifying round

Notes

References

External links
Official website 

Partizani
FK Partizani Tirana seasons
Partizani